Novosphingobium is a genus of Gram-negative bacteria that includes N. taihuense, which can degrade aromatic compounds such as phenol, aniline, nitrobenzene and phenanthrene. The species N. aromativorans, which was first found in Ulsan Bay, similarly degrades aromatic molecules of two to five rings.

Species

Accepted Species
Novosphingobium comprises the following species:

 Novosphingobium acidiphilum Glaeser et al. 2009
 Novosphingobium aquaticum Glaeser et al. 2013
 Novosphingobium aquimarinum Le et al. 2020
 Novosphingobium aquiterrae Lee et al. 2014
 Novosphingobium arabidopsis Lin et al. 2014
 Novosphingobium aromaticivorans corrig. (Balkwill et al. 1997) Takeuchi et al. 2001

 Novosphingobium arvoryzae Sheu et al. 2018
 Novosphingobium barchaimii Niharika et al. 2013
 Novosphingobium bradum Sheu et al. 2016
 Novosphingobium capsulatum (Leifson 1962) Takeuchi et al. 2001
 Novosphingobium chloroacetimidivorans Chen et al. 2014
 Novosphingobium clariflavum Zhang et al. 2017
 Novosphingobium colocasiae Chen et al. 2016
 Novosphingobium endophyticum Li et al. 2016
 Novosphingobium flavum Nguyen et al. 2016
 Novosphingobium fluoreni Gao et al. 2015
 Novosphingobium fontis Sheu et al. 2017
 Novosphingobium fuchskuhlense Glaeser et al. 2013
 Novosphingobium gossypii Kämpfer et al. 2015
 Novosphingobium guangzhouense Sha et al. 2017
 Novosphingobium hassiacum Kämpfer et al. 2002
 Novosphingobium humi Hyeon et al. 2017
 Novosphingobium indicum Yuan et al. 2009
 Novosphingobium ipomoeae Chen et al. 2017
 Novosphingobium kunmingense Xie et al. 2014
 Novosphingobium lentum Tiirola et al. 2005
 Novosphingobium lindaniclasticum Saxena et al. 2013
 Novosphingobium lotistagni Ngo et al. 2016
 Novosphingobium lubricantis Kämpfer et al. 2018
 Novosphingobium malaysiense Lee et al. 2014
 Novosphingobium marinum Huo et al. 2015
 Novosphingobium mathurense Gupta et al. 2009
 Novosphingobium meiothermophilum Xian et al. 2019
 Novosphingobium naphthae Chaudhary and Kim 2016
 Novosphingobium naphthalenivorans Suzuki and Hiraishi 2008
 Novosphingobium nitrogenifigens Addison et al. 2007
 Novosphingobium olei Chaudhary et al. 2021
 Novosphingobium oryzae Zhang et al. 2016
 Novosphingobium ovatum Chen et al. 2020
 Novosphingobium panipatense Gupta et al. 2009
 Novosphingobium pentaromativorans Sohn et al. 2004
 Novosphingobium piscinae Sheu et al. 2016
 Novosphingobium pokkalii Krishnan et al. 2017
 Novosphingobium resinovorum (Delaporte and Daste 1956) Lim et al. 2007
 Novosphingobium rhizosphaerae Kämpfer et al. 2015
 Novosphingobium rosa corrig. (Takeuchi et al. 1995) Takeuchi et al. 2001

 Novosphingobium sediminicola Baek et al. 2011
 Novosphingobium silvae Feng et al. 2020
 Novosphingobium soli Kämpfer et al. 2011

 Novosphingobium stygium corrig. (Balkwill et al. 1997) Takeuchi et al. 2001

 Novosphingobium subterraneum corrig. (Balkwill et al. 1997) Takeuchi et al. 2001

 Novosphingobium taihuense Liu et al. 2005

 Novosphingobium umbonatum Sheu et al. 2020

Provisional Species
The following species names have been published, but not validated according to the Bacteriological Code:
 "Novosphingobium aquaticum" Singh et al. 2015
 "Novosphingobium ginsenosidimutans" Kim et al. 2013
 "Novosphingobium profundi" Zhang et al. 2017
 "Novosphingobium sediminis" Li et al. 2012
 "Novosphingobium tardum" Chen et al. 2015

References

Hydrocarbon-degrading bacteria
Bacteria genera
Sphingomonadales